Pirch or PIRCH may refer to:

People
Georg Dubislav Ludwig von Pirch - Prussian general during Napoleonic Wars
Otto Karl Lorenz von Pirch - Prussian general during Napoleonic Wars

Other
PIRCH (company) - retail company
PIRCH (IRC client) - shareware Internet Relay Chat (IRC) client